Moosomin/Marshall McLeod Field Airport  is located  northeast of Moosomin, Saskatchewan, Canada.

See also 
 List of airports in Saskatchewan

References 

Registered aerodromes in Saskatchewan
Moosomin No. 121, Saskatchewan